Ixonanthes is a genus of trees in the family Ixonanthaceae. It contains the following species:
 Ixonanthes chinensis, Champ. - China, Vietnam
 Ixonanthes icosandra, Jack
 Ixonanthes khasiana, Hook.f. - India
 Ixonanthes petiolaris, Blume - from Thailand to Philippines and Sulawesi
 Ixonanthes reticulata, Jack - from India to New Guinea

References

Ixonanthaceae
Malpighiales genera
Taxonomy articles created by Polbot